Khlebino is a village (selo) in Tengushevsky District of the Republic of Mordovia.

References

Rural localities in Mordovia
Tengushevsky District